Amrita Hospital is  private hospital in Faridabad, India. It is the largest private multi-specialist hospital in Asia, and was inaugurated by Prime Minister Narendra Modi. It has 2,600 beds, 81 specialities, 64 fully-networked modular operation theatres and smart ICUs with 534 critical care beds and a helipad on the roof. It is one of the largest hospitals by capacity. It is affiliated to Amrita Vishwa Vidyapeetham School of medicine.

Construction 
The hospital is spread over 130 acres with a built up area of 3.6 million square feet. It has nursing colleges and college for Allied Health Sciences and has a seven-story research block and eight centres of excellence. The price of construction was estimated to be 60 billion rupees.

Inauguration 
The hospital was inaugurated on 24 August 2022  by Prime Minister of India, Narendra Modi and facilitated by Sadguru Mata Amritanandamayi Devi in the presence of Chief minister of Haryana Manohar Lal Khattar and Governor of Haryana Bandaru Dattatreya. Stanford Medical school prof Dr. Michael Snyder was also keynote speaker in the event.

References 

Mata Amritanandamayi Math
Hospitals in Delhi
Hospitals in Haryana